Kurucaşile is a town in Bartın Province in the Black Sea Region of Turkey. It is the seat of Kurucaşile District. Its population is 2,097 (2021). It lies on the Black Sea coast. The mayor is Mehmet Zihni Sayın (AKP).

Climate
Köppen-Geiger climate classification system classifies its climate as oceanic (Cfb).

References

Populated places in Bartın Province
Fishing communities in Turkey
Populated coastal places in Turkey
Towns in Turkey
Kurucaşile District